The Gulf Coast Hockey League was a short-lived minor professional ice hockey league in the Gulf Coast region of the United States. The league existed for the 2001–02 season, before folding.

2001/02 teams
Dallas Sabres
Houston Blast
Little Rock Wildcats
Texarkana Bandits

External links
League profile on hockeydb.com

Defunct ice hockey leagues in the United States
2001–02 in American ice hockey by league